Uttaradit Saksiam Football Club (Thai: สโมสรฟุตบอลอุตรดิตถ์ ศักดิ์สยาม) is a Thai semi-professional football club based in Uttaradit Province. They currently play in Thai League 3 Northern Region.

Timeline
History of events of Uttaradit Football Club

Stadium and locations

Season records

P = Played
W = Games won
D = Games drawn
L = Games lost
F = Goals for
A = Goals against
Pts = Points
Pos = Final position

DQ = Disqualified
QR1 = First Qualifying Round
QR2 = Second Qualifying Round
QR3 = Third Qualifying Round
QR4 = Fourth Qualifying Round
RInt = Intermediate Round
R1 = Round 1
R2 = Round 2
R3 = Round 3

R4 = Round 4
R5 = Round 5
R6 = Round 6
GR = Group stage
QF = Quarter-finals
SF = Semi-finals
RU = Runners-up
S = Shared
W = Winners

Players

Current squad

Club officials

Honours

Domestic leagues
 Thai League 4 Northern Region
 Winners (2): 2018, 2019

References

External links 
 Official Facebook page
 Uttaradit FC Blogspot

Association football clubs established in 2009
Football clubs in Thailand
Sport in Uttaradit province
2009 establishments in Thailand